František Marek was a Czech hurdler. He competed in the men's 110 metres hurdles at the 1920 Summer Olympics.

References

Year of birth missing
Year of death missing
Athletes (track and field) at the 1920 Summer Olympics
Czech male hurdlers
Olympic athletes of Czechoslovakia
Place of birth missing